Wilson Bryant Burtt (January 1, 1875 – March 21, 1957) was a career United States Army officer and served as a brigadier general during World War I.

Early life 
Burtt was born in Hinsdale, Illinois on January 1, 1875.

Military career 

He graduated from the United States Military Academy at West Point in 1899, was commissioned as a second lieutenant with the 8th Infantry Regiment, and was shipped off to Cuba immediately.

Following the Spanish–American War, Burtt was stationed in the Philippines to 1904. He returned to the States and was a professor of Military Science and Tactics at Kentucky State University. Burtt returned to the Philippines in 1907 and would remain there until 1910. In 1913 and 1914 Burtt instructed the California National Guard. He observed the German armies in the field from 1915 to 1916. During the Punitive Expeditionary Force in Mexico, Burtt served under General John J. Pershing.

During World War I, Burtt was the Assistant Chief of the Air Service and chief of staff, Fifth Army Corps. He served in most of the major battles of the war.

Following the war, he was an instructor at the General Staff College. In 1920, he resigned as a major but was reappointed the same year. He resigned as a brigadier general in 1938, but in 1942 was made a major general on the retired list.

Awards 
Burtt was awarded the Distinguished Service Medal for his performance of duty as Chief of Staff of the 5th Corps. The citation for the medal reads:

He also received the Legion of Honour and Croix de Guerre from France, Order of St Michael and St George from Britain, and the Order of the Crown of Italy.

Death and legacy 
Burtt died in Chelsea, Massachusetts on March 21, 1957. He was buried at Arlington National Cemetery.

References

External links 

Arlington National Cemetery

1875 births
1957 deaths
Military personnel from Illinois
United States Army generals
People from Hinsdale, Illinois
United States Military Academy alumni
United States Army generals of World War I
Recipients of the Distinguished Service Medal (US Army)
Recipients of the Legion of Honour
Recipients of the Croix de Guerre (France)
American military personnel of the Spanish–American War
Recipients of the Order of the Crown (Italy)
Companions of the Order of St Michael and St George
Burials at Arlington National Cemetery